Richard Arrington Jr. (born October 19, 1934 in Livingston, Alabama) was the first Black mayor of the city of Birmingham, Alabama (U.S.), serving 20 years, from 1979 to 1999. He replaced David Vann and, upon retiring after five terms in office, installed then-City Council president William A. Bell as interim mayor. Bell went on to lose the next election to Bernard Kincaid.

Early life
Arrington's father moved his family to the steel-town of Fairfield, Alabama from rural Sumter County, Alabama when Richard Jr. was five years old to take a job with U.S. Steel. The steady work was an improvement over sharecropping, but Richard Sr. still had to supplement the family income by working off-hours as a brick mason.

His parents emphasized self-reliance, choosing to rent a home rather than stay in workers' housing and shopping at a black-owned cooperative store rather than accept credit at the company commissary. Richard's mother, Ernestine, kept the table filled with home-grown vegetables and made sure that her children made use of the opportunities given them through church and school.

Richard, while still a teenager, served as secretary of the Sunday School at Crumbey Bethel Primitive Baptist Church. Soon he was Sunday School superintendent, a member of the choir, and eventually elected to the Board of Deacons. He was also a standout student at Fairfield Industrial High School, where he had first decided to study tailoring. With those classes full, he instead learned dry cleaning, graduating in 1951 at the age of 16 he took a job at a cleaner and applied to Fairfield's Miles College.

Academic career
Arrington majored in biology at Miles and excelled in the classroom and as a leader, rising to the presidency of his chapter of the Alpha Phi Alpha fraternity. He was also an officer in the Honor Society and the Thespian Club. In his third year of college, while still living at home, he married Barbara Jean Watts. He graduated cum laude in 1955 and took a position as a graduate assistant at the University of Detroit in Detroit, Michigan. While there he first experienced an integrated social environment and gained the perspective necessary to effectively critique the established segregation of his home town. He earned a master's degree in 1957 and returned to Miles as an assistant professor of science where he taught for six years before entering the University of Oklahoma doctoral program in zoology in 1963, in the midst of Birmingham campaign between African-American protesters and city authorities in Birmingham. He earned his doctorate at Oklahoma in 1966, completing a dissertation on the "Comparative Morphology of Some Dryopoid Beetles", and, at the urging of President Lucius Pitts, returned to Miles as acting dean and director of the summer school. He was quickly promoted to chair of the Natural Sciences Department and eventually was named Dean of the College.

Political career
In 1971, Arrington began campaigning for election to the Birmingham City Council with the pledge to make Birmingham "a city of which all her people can be proud." He placed third among 29 at-large candidates and faced five opponents in a runoff election for three remaining seats. He won his seat easily, becoming, after Arthur Shores (who had been appointed to a vacant seat by Mayor George Siebels in 1968), the second African American to serve on the council. After two years of quiet service, he introduced an ordinance requiring city departments to formulate hiring plans that included affirmative action goals and to contract business to companies that hired minorities. With opposition in the business community, the latter action failed, but the departmental hiring ordinance made it out of council to be vetoed by Siebels. Revised proposals that established recruitment programs and prohibited contracting with openly discriminatory firms, were later passed. His next major controversy was to push for a formal investigation of the shooting of an African American suspect while he was under police custody. The hearing was inconclusive, but opened the door to a more serious look at police procedure.

Arrington also co-founded and served as the first president of the Alabama New South Coalition, a liberal advocacy organization which split off from the Alabama Democratic Conference over strategic and leadership differences.

References

Mark Kelly. "Toward a New Birmingham: A Four Part Series on the Life and Times of Richard Arrington Jr." Birmingham Weekly. October 19 – November 10, 2005

External links
Oral History Interview with Richard Arrington from Oral Histories of the American South

1934 births
Living people
African-American mayors in Alabama
American entomologists
People from Livingston, Alabama
Mayors of Birmingham, Alabama
Alabama city council members
Miles College alumni
University of Detroit Mercy alumni
21st-century African-American people
20th-century African-American people